Qoçəhmədli (also, Ghouchahmedli and Kochakhmedli) is a village in the Fuzuli District of Azerbaijan. It was occupied by the self-proclaimed Republic of Artsakh since the First Nagorno-Karabakh war until its recapture by Azerbaijan on 17 October 2020.

Notable natives 
Gochag Askarov, folk singer and piano player

References 

Populated places in Fuzuli District